Stephen Tapilatu (born March 17, 1972 in Groningen) is a prominent Dutch martial artist who has achieved success at the highest level primarily in ITF but also in WTF taekwondo. He began taekwondo at the age of 8 under the tutelage of his black belt father, Wijnand Tapilatu. He became ITF World Champion in 1990 and 1994 and won two European titles, in 1990 and 1992. In 1991 he won a silver medal at the WTF World Championship in Athens. Tapilatu fought his way to victory in the prestigious King of Taekwondo competition in Tokyo, Japan, in 1995 and 1996.

After completing his taekwondo career he took up kickboxing and Mixed Martial Arts (MMA), notably challenging leading figures including Dutch karate champion Ronny Rivano, Brian Lo-An-Joe and the former kickboxing world champion Perry Ubeda. From 1999 to 2008 he was a member of Team Golden Glory, alongside one of the most successful fighters of all time: Semmy Schilt.

Stephen Tapilatu is a member of a large and successful taekwondo family headed by his father Master Wijnand Tapilatu, who was a member of the winning Dutch team that took the 1984 World Taekwondo Championship. His sister Bianca and his cousins Django and Patiparu have also won many ITF titles. Bianca Tapilatu is married to Tomaž Barada, three times ITF World Champion and six times ITF European champion.

He retired from competitive martial arts in 2008. Since that time he has taught taekwondo with his father at Tapilatu's sport center in his home town of Groningen, the Netherlands. He is also much in demand as a personal trainer, and in 2012 played a key role in the return to form of the footballer Género Zeefuik, who began his career at Ajax and currently plays for FC Groningen.

Stephen Tapilatu was appointed national coach of ITF Netherlands in November 2012.

In July 2022 Tapilatu was promoted to the rank of 7th Dan black belt, joining an elite group of only 2 other ITF taekwondo practitioners currently holding this rank in the Netherlands.

Mixed martial arts record

|-
| Win
| align=center| 3-2-2
| Chico Martinez
| Decision (unanimous)
| Rings Holland: The Untouchables
| 
| align=center| 2
| align=center| 5:00
| Utrecht, Netherlands
| 
|-
| Draw
| align=center| 2-2-2
| Furdjel de Windt
| Draw
| BOTN 1: Battle of the North 1
| 
| align=center| 0
| align=center| 0:00
| Thialf, Heerenveen, Netherlands
| 
|-
| Loss
| align=center| 2-2-1
| Ronny Rivano
| TKO (leg injury)
| 2H2H 4: Simply the Best 4
| 
| align=center| 0
| align=center| N/A
| Rotterdam, South Holland, Netherlands
| 
|-
| Win
| align=center| 2-1-1
| Brian Lo-A-Njoe
| Decision (unanimous)
| Rings Holland: Some Like It Hard
| 
| align=center| 2
| align=center| 5:00
| Utrecht, Netherlands
| 
|-
| Loss
| align=center| 1-1-1
| Ronny Rivano
| Submission (rear-naked choke)
| 2H2H 3: Hotter Than Hot
| 
| align=center| 1
| align=center| 4:19
| Rotterdam, South Holland, Netherlands
| 
|-
| Win
| align=center| 1-0-1
| Jeffrey Heijm
| Decision (unanimous)
| Rings Holland: Di Capo Di Tutti Capi
| 
| align=center| 2
| align=center| 5:00
| Utrecht, Netherlands
| 
|-
| Draw
| align=center| 0-0-1
| Brian Lo-A-Njoe
| Draw
| Rings Holland: The Thialf Explosion
| 
| align=center| 0
| align=center| 0:00
| Heerenveen, Netherlands
|

References

1972 births
Living people
Dutch male taekwondo practitioners
Dutch male mixed martial artists
Mixed martial artists utilizing taekwondo
Dutch male kickboxers
Sportspeople from Groningen (city)
21st-century Dutch people